County Louth is a coastal county in the Eastern and Midland Region of Ireland, within the province of Leinster. Louth is bordered by the counties of Meath to the south, Monaghan to the west, Armagh to the north and Down to the north-east, across Carlingford Lough. It is the smallest county in Ireland by land area and the 17th most populous, with just over 139,100 residents as of 2022. The county is named after the village of Louth. Louth County Council is the local authority for the county.

History

County Louth is named after the village of Louth, which in turn is named after Lugh, a god of the ancient Irish.

The county is steeped in myth, legend and history, and is a setting in the  epic. Later it saw the influence of the Vikings, as seen in the name of Carlingford Lough. They also established a longphort at Annagassan in the ninth century. At the same time, the area was removed from the diocese of Armagh and the episcopal see of the Diocese of Airgíalla or Clogher was transferred to Louth .

A number of historic sites are in the county, including religious sites at Monasterboice, Mellifont Abbey and the St Mary Magdalene Dominican Friary.

The Normans occupied the Louth area in the 1180s, forming the County of Oriel (Uriel or Vriell) out of the O'Carroll kingdom. At this time the western boundary of occupation was unfixed and Monaghan was still considered part of Oriel.

In the early 14th century Edward Bruce made claim to the High Kingship of Ireland and led an expeditionary force to Ireland. The Scottish army was repulsed from Drogheda but laid waste to much of the Anglo-Norman colony of Ireland including Ardee and Dundalk. Edward was crowned on the hill of Maledon near Dundalk on 2 May 1316. His army was finally defeated and Edward was killed in the Battle of Faughart near Dundalk, by a chiefly local force led by John de Bermingham. He was created 1st Earl of Louth and granted estates at Ardee on 12 May 1319 as a reward for his services to the Crown in defeating the Scots. De Bermingham was subsequently killed in the Braganstown massacre on 13 June 1329 along with some 200 members of his family and household, in a feud between the Anglo-Irish families of Louth.

One of the Statutes of Kilkenny in 1465 (5 Ed. IV,  3) stated "That every Irishman that dwell betwixt or amongst Englishmen in the County of Dublin, Myeth, Vriell [i.e. Oriel], and Kildare ... shall take to him an English surname of one town, as Sutton, Chester, Trym, Skryne, Corke, Kinsale; or colour, as white, blacke, browne; or arte or science, as smith or carpenter; or office, as cooke, butler ...". This was an attempt to compel Irish families in the Pale, including Louth, to adopt English surnames.

In 1189, a royal charter was granted to Dundalk after a Norman nobleman named Bertram de Verdun erected a manor house at Castletown Mount. Bertram's granddaughter Roesia de Verdun later built Castle Roche in 1236. In 1412, a royal charter was granted to Drogheda which unified the towns of Drogheda-in-Meath and Drogheda-in-Uriel (Louth) as a County in its own right, styled as ‘the County of the town of Drogheda’. Drogheda continued as a County Borough until the setting up of County Councils, through the enactment of the Local Government (Ireland) Act 1898, which saw all of Drogheda, including a large area south of the River Boyne, become part of an extended County Louth.

Until the late 16th century, 1596, Louth was considered part of Ulster, before becoming part of Leinster after a conference held at Faughart between the Chiefs of Ulster (Hugh O'Neill, Earl of Tyrone and Hugh Roe O'Donnell), on the Irish side, and the Ulster-born Miler Magrath, Anglican Archbishop of Cashel, and Thomas Butler, 10th Earl of Ormond on that of the English. The lands of Ballymascanlan, part of the former estates of Mellifont Abbey, were transferred from Armagh to Louth .

The 16th and 17th centuries featured many skirmishes and battles involving Irish and English forces, as Louth was on the main route to 'the Moiry Pass' and the Ulster areas often in rebellion and as yet uncolonised. Oliver Cromwell attacked Drogheda in 1649 slaughtering the Royalist garrison and hundreds of the town's citizens. Drogheda held for James under Lord Iveagh but surrendered to William the day after the battle of the Boyne.

In 1798, the leaders of the United Irishmen included Bartholomew Teeling, John Byrne, and Patrick Byrne, all from Castletown; Anthony Marmion from Louth Town and Dundalk, Anthony McCann from Corderry; Nicholas and Thomas Markey from Barmeath, and Arthur McKeown, John Warren, and James McAllister from Cambricville. They were betrayed by informers, notably a Dr Conlan, who came from Dundalk, and an agent provocateur called Sam Turner, from Newry. Several leaders were hanged.

The Burning of Wildgoose Lodge took place on the night of 29–30 October 1816, for which 18 men were executed.

The priest and scientist Nicholas Callan (1799–1864), inventor of the first induction coil, was from Darver.

Geography 

Louth, colloquially known as "The Wee County", is the smallest of Ireland's 32 counties by area. It is the 17th most populous county, making it the fourth most densely populated county on the island of Ireland. It is the smallest of Leinster's 12 counties in size and the 6th-largest by population. Louth is bordered by four counties - Meath to the south, Monaghan to the west, Armagh to the north, and Down to the northeast. It bounded to the east by the Irish sea. Louth is also the northernmost county in Leinster, and the only county in the province to share a border with Northern Ireland.

Climate

Louth has a temperate oceanic climate (Köppen climate classification Cfb), with cool humid summers and mild winters, strongly influenced by Atlantic ocean currents. Coastal areas generally experience milder winters and cooler, windier summers than inland areas. Daytime highs are generally in the  range throughout the county in July, with overnight lows in the  range. January and February are the coldest months, with average daily minimum temperatures typically falling below .

Met Éireann records climate data for the county from their station at Boharnamoe, ca.  from Ardee, in the southwest of the county. Due to the moderating influence of the Irish sea, the temperature at Ardee has only surpassed  once since records began in 1968. Prolonged or heavy snow is rare, but most of the county will typically experience snowfall on a few days per year.

There are a number of synoptic weather stations which solely record rainfall located throughout the county. The driest areas are located along the coast, with average annual rainfall at Clogherhead being , making it one of the driest locations on the island of Ireland. The wettest areas of the county are located around the Cooley Mountains, with the stations at Omeath and Glenmore recording the most rainfall in the county.

The coastal areas of the county are particularly vulnerable to flooding and storm surges during the Winter months, and significant flood defences have been constructed along Dundalk Bay. Louth County Council's Climate Change Adaptation Strategy identified coastal and riverine flooding as the primary environmental risks to the county.

Demographics

Population

According to the 2016 census, Louth had a population of 128,884 as of the 2016 census, a 4.9% increase since the 2011 census. The population density of the county is 155.4 people per square kilometre, more than double the national average, which makes Louth the second most densely populated county in the Republic of Ireland, and the fourth most densely populated county on the island of Ireland. As of 2016, Louth was also the second most urbanised county in the State, with 67.6% of the county's population living within urban areas. Under Central Statistics Office (CSO) classification, an "urban area" is a town with a population greater than 1,500. As a result, much of the county outside of the larger towns is relatively sparsely populated, with most small areas (SAs) having a population density of between 20 and 50 people per km2.

The county has two dominant population centres, Dundalk, located in the north of the county, and Drogheda, located in the south on the border with County Meath. These two towns combined comprise approximately 58.3% of the county's total population, and are the 6th- and 8th-largest urban areas in Ireland respectively. Overall, Drogheda is the larger of the two; however, the town's southern environs — home to roughly 5,000 people — are located in Meath. Therefore, Dundalk is the largest settlement wholly located within Louth and is also the county town.

 
Louth has experienced a rapid rate of population growth since the 1960s, nearly doubling in size over the fifty years between the census of 1966 and that of 2016. Its rate of growth (4.9%) since the 2011 census ranks 7th of 26 counties. The sizeable population growth in the county is influenced by its location along the Dublin–Belfast corridor; with the completion of the M1 motorway in particular driving the growth of Drogheda as a commuter town of Dublin. However, the northern areas of the county along the border with Northern Ireland experienced a slight decline in population between 2011 and 2016.

In 2016, Louth reached an all-time high population of 128,884 people, becoming one of only five counties in the State to surpass its pre-famine (1841 Census) peak. As of the 2016 census, 7.4 per cent of the county's population was reported as younger than 5 years old, 27.8 per cent were between 5 and 25, 52.4 per cent were between 25 and 65, and 12.4 per cent of the population was older than 65. Of this latter group, 3,560 people (2.8 per cent) were over the age of 80. The population was evenly split between females (50.63 per cent) and males (49.37 per cent).

In 2019, there were 1,700 births within the county, and the average age of a first time mother was 30.

Urban areas
The most populous towns in Louth as of the 2016 census were (population in parentheses):

Ethnicity and migration
As of the 2016 census, the population of County Louth was 91.5% white. Those who identified as White Irish constituted 83% of the county's population, and Irish Travellers comprised a further 0.6%. Caucasians who did not identify as ethnically Irish accounted for 7.8% of the population.

The second largest ethnic group in Louth in 2016 was black, accounting for 2.8% of the population. Of this group, virtually the entire population lived in the two largest towns, with 50.5% of Louth's black residents living in Dundalk and 44.5% living in Drogheda.

Those of Asian and Mixed Race backgrounds accounted for 1.9% (2,399 people) and 1.4% (1,756 people) of the population respectively, with the majority of these groups residing in either Drogheda or Dundalk. Around 3,000 people or 2.5% of the population did not state their ethnicity in 2016.

In contrast to the other counties in the Mid-East Region, which are characterised by widespread migration from Dublin, Louth has one of the highest proportions of native residents in Ireland. Around two-thirds (66.2%) of Louth's residents were born within the county, making it the 7th most indigenous county in the State. People from Dublin accounted for just 7% of Louth's population in 2016, compared with 28% in neighbouring Meath to the south. A total of 18,638 people (14.6%) were born elsewhere in Ireland, and 24,509 people (19.2%) were born outside of the country.

As with other border counties, people from Northern Ireland make up the largest proportion of people born outside of the Republic of Ireland within Louth. Those born in Northern Ireland comprise 5.5% of Louth's population, and people born in Britain comprise a further 3.1% of the population.

Apart from the United Kingdom, the five largest foreign national groups in Louth are: Polish (2.2 percent), Lithuanian (1.6 percent), Nigerian (0.7 percent), Latvian (0.6 percent) and Pakistani (0.45 percent).

Irish language
The Cooley Peninsula was the last  outpost in Leinster. Speakers of Irish existed around Omeath and into southern Armagh up until the middle of the 20th century. The area had its own local dialect, songs, poetry and traditional customs. However, extensive recordings were made by German linguist Wilhelm Doegen for the Royal Irish Academy in 1916. An Irish language college, was originally established in Omeath in 1912, but later moved to Ranafast, County Donegal.

Uniquely, the Cooley Peninsula had a sizable population of Presbyterian  in the late 18th and 19th centuries, owing to its proximity to Ulster. In 1808, Reverend William Neilson published "An introduction to the Irish language" to distribute to Presbyterian ministers in the area, as many in their congregations could not speak English.

Despite its historic , Louth has the lowest percentage of Irish speakers of any county in the State. In the 2016 Census, just 34.1% of the population stated that they could speak Irish.

Religion

According to the Central Statistics Office (CSO), the Catholic Church is by far the largest religious institution in County Louth, with 105,186 members. Anglican denominations, including the Church of Ireland, England and Episcopalian, were the second largest group, with 2,079 members. There were 1,825 Muslims recorded in the 2016 Census, as well as 1,471 Orthodox Christians.

The county is located within the archdiocese of Armagh in the Roman Catholic Church, and the Archbishop of Armagh has been recognised by the Vatican as the "Primate of All Ireland" since 1353. This was replicated in the Church of Ireland following the Reformation, and the Protestant Diocese of Armagh covers the same territorial extent as the Catholic diocese. Further, the Archbishop of Armagh also has the title of Primate of All Ireland within the Church of Ireland.

As was the case in much of Ireland, there was a significant increase in the number of people stating that they were either non-religious or atheist in the 2016 Census. This demographic increased by 81% between 2011 and 2016, from 5,485 to 9,918. People with no religion now account for nearly 8% of the county's population.

The fastest growing religions in the county between 2011 and 2016 were Evangelicalism (499%), Islam (56%) and Orthodox Christianity (50%), while the most rapidly declining religions were Methodist/Wesleyan (-25%), Apostolic or Pentecostal (-10.5%) and Presbyterian (-6.5%).

Local government and politics

Louth County Council

The local authority is Louth County Council, which has its offices in Dundalk, and provides a number of services including planning, roads maintenance, fire brigade, council housing, water supply, waste collection, recycling and landfill, higher education grants and funding for arts and culture.

As of the 2019 local election, Louth has been divided into five local electoral areas, whose councillors sit in three municipal districts: Ardee (which is also a municipal district), Drogheda Rural and Drogheda Rural (which form the borough district of Drogheda), and Dundalk—Carlingford and Dundalk South (which form the municipal district of Dundalk).

Freedom of the county
The Following People and Military Units have received the Freedom of County Louth.

 Joe Biden: 25 June 2016.

Louth Dáil constituency

For elections to Dáil Éireann, Louth is represented by the five-seat Dáil constituency of Louth which takes all in the county of Louth, and in County Meath, the electoral divisions of Julianstown and part of St. Mary's.

The Report on Dáil and European Parliament Constituencies 2007 outlined:
This brought the areas of the Greater Drogheda area in County Meath and their combined population of 20,375 into a single constituency.

At the 2020 general election, the constituency elected two Sinn Féin TDs (nationalist and left-wing), one Fine Gael TD (centre-right), one Labour Party TD (centre-left) and an Independent TD (formerly Fine Gael).

Places of interest 

Carlingford Lough
Cooley Peninsula
County Museum Dundalk
King John's Castle (Carlingford)
Linn Duachaill
Magdalene Tower, Drogheda
Mellifont Abbey
Millmount Fort
Monasterboice
St. Laurence's Gate
St. Peter's Roman Catholic Church, Drogheda, where the head of St. Oliver Plunkett is housed.

People

Entertainment
Pierce Brosnan - Actor, James Bond
Eamonn Campbell - Member of The Dubliners
Andrea Corr - Singer, The Corrs
Caroline Corr - Musician, The Corrs
Jim Corr - Musician, The Corrs
Sharon Corr - Musician, The Corrs
Evanna Lynch -  Actress, Harry Potter
Cathy Maguire - Singer/songwriter
John Moore - Film director
Pádraigín Ní Uallacháin, traditional Irish singer and academic.
Gerry O'Connor - Traditional Irish fiddle player
Colin O'Donoghue - Actor, Once Upon a Time
Emily Taaffe - ActorMilitary
James Samuel Emerson (1895–1917), British soldier and posthumous Irish recipient of the Victoria Cross,
Patrick Anthony Langan-Byrne, British pilot, who was an Irish flying ace of the First World War credited with Ten aerial victories.
Admiral Francis Leopold McClintock KCB FRS - British Royal Navy officer and Explorer
George Martin Lees (1898–1955), British soldier, geologist and leading authority on the geology of the Middle East.
Major-General Arthur Thomas Moore VC - British Soldier and Irish recipient of the Victoria Cross.
Albert Cashier (otherwise Jennie Irene Hodgers), was born in Clogherhead and was a soldier in the Union Army during the American Civil War
Lisa Smith (soldier), a former Irish soldier who converted to Islam and later travelled to Syria during the Syrian Civil War to join Islamic State of Iraq and the Levant (ISIS).
Anthony Coningham Sterling (1805–1871), British Army officer and historian, author of The Highland Brigade in the Crimea.James Sheridan (Medal of Honor) , Quartermaster United States during the American Civil War - Sailor and recipient of the Medal of Honor for action at Battle of Mobile Bay
Hans Moore (1834–89), British Army Major who received the Victoria Cross during the Cape Frontier Wars
William Kenny (1880-1936), British Soldier and Irish recipient of the Victoria Cross
John Barrett Captain of HMS Minotaur (1793) and HMS Africa (1781)

Politics
Dermot Ahern - Politician, Fianna Fáil TD for Louth
Paddy O'Hanlon - Former Nationalist MP for South Armagh
James Carroll - Politician, Fianna Fáil, member of Seanad Éireann from Louth
Éamonn Ceannt, Irish republican known for his role in the Easter Rising of 1916. Born Galway, raised and educated in Louth.
Mark Dearey - Politician, Green Party Senator from Louth
Damien English - Politician, of Fine Gael who has served as Minister of State since 2014.
John Foster, 1st Baron Oriel (1740–1828), last Speaker of the Irish House of Commons.
Séamus Kirk - Politician, Fianna Fáil TD for Louth
Tony Martin, Canadian social democratic legislator.
John McClintock (1770–1855), MP for Athlone 1820, for County Louth 1830–31
Brendan McGahon - Politician, Fine Gael TD for Louth
John McGahon, Fine Gael Senator
Michael McKevitt - Republican dissident leader
Arthur Morgan - Politician, Sinn Féin TD for Louth
T.K. Whitaker (Irish Economist)
William Hughes, Irish-born US senator from New Jersey.

Sport
Thomas Byrne - Former racing driver
Nick Colgan - Footballer, currently playing for Grimsby Town F.C.
Kenny Finn - Irish American soccer and Gaelic football player
Beatrice Hill-Lowe - Archer
Gary Kelly - Footballer, Leeds United
Robert Kearney - Irish Rugby player
Colin Larkin - footballer, Hartlepool United
Tommy Smyth - Football commentator for ESPN
Steve Staunton - Footballer
Kevin Thornton - Footballer
Ian Harte - Footballer

Misc
Fr Nicholas Joseph Callan, priest and scientist best known for his work on the induction coil.
George Drumgoole Coleman - Civil architect
Dorothy Macardle, historian.
Matthew O'Neill, 1st Baron Dungannon, alias'' Matthew Kelly, (1520 – 1558), born in Dundalk. Father of Hugh O'Neill, Earl of Tyrone.
Katherine Plunket, (1820–1932), was an Irish aristocrat from Ballymascanlan, County Louth, a prolific botanical illustrator and formerly the oldest person ever to be born and die in Ireland, at 111 years and 327 days.
Nano Reid, artist.
Peter Rice - Structural engineer.
Alexander Williams, artist. Born in Monaghan, raised and educated in Louth.

Gallery

See also
List of abbeys and priories in the Republic of Ireland#County Louth
List of castles in Ireland#County Louth
Lord Lieutenant of Louth
High Sheriff of Louth
List of songs about Louth

References

External links

Carlingford town local site
Drogheda Tourism - Official Site of the Drogheda Tourist Office
Dunleer town portal
Dunleer Parish
Louth County Council
Council and Democracy Maps – Maps of local electoral areas, municipal districts, and electoral divisions
Omeath town local site
Tallanstown Tidy Towns 
CSO Louth

 

 
Louth
Louth
Louth